Frédéric Stilmant (born 1 May 1979) is a Belgian football player who plays as a midfielder for URS Centre in the Belgian Second Division.

Career
Stilmant played for Oostende in the Belgian First Division during the 2004–05 season. He previously played for R.O.C. de Charleroi-Marchienne.

References

1979 births
Living people
Belgian footballers
Oud-Heverlee Leuven players
R. Olympic Charleroi Châtelet Farciennes players
A.F.C. Tubize players
K.V. Oostende players
UR La Louvière Centre players
Belgian Pro League players
Challenger Pro League players
Association football midfielders